Tatakoto is an atoll in the Tuamotu group in French Polynesia.

Tatakoto is one of the more isolated atolls of the Tuamotus. It is situated in the east of the archipelago,  from Tahiti. It has one large island and 65 islets separated by numerous channels on the reef surrounding the lagoon. The islands are mostly located on its windward side (south). All the islands are flat, not much higher than the ocean level. Its land area is about 7.3 km2, and the lagoon area is about 20 km2.

The main settlement is Tumukuru, and the total population was 259 in the 2017 census.

History
Tatakoto Atoll was sighted the same day by two Spaniards. In the second expedition of the Águila, the two captains, Domingo de Bonechea and José Andía y Varela, separated when leaving Peru and did not see each other until reaching Tahiti. On 29 October 1774 (the day of Saint Narcissus) the two disembarked on Tatakoto without meeting. They named the island "San Narciso". Historically the island was also known as "d'Augier".

Chronicler José Andía described the atoll as "extremely agreeable to the eyes by being very populated by shrubs." At the beginning of the twentieth century France established a colony and replanted the island with coconut palms, which still cover the island.

Tatakoto Airport was inaugurated in 1979.

Administration
Administratively Tatakoto Atoll has its own commune, which belongs to the Îles Tuamotu-Gambier administrative subdivision of French Polynesia.

Transport 
The atoll is served by the Tatakoto Airport .

References

Tatakoto Airport (TKV)

External links

Presidency of French Polynesia site
Atoll list (in French)
Maps

Communes of French Polynesia
Atolls of the Tuamotus